Jeffrey Vincent Smith MBE (born 1934) is an English former professional motorcycle racer.

His achievements in motorcycle racing include two FIM 500cc Motocross World Championships (1964, 1965), two British Trials Championships, multiple British Experts Trial wins, four individual race wins in the Motocross des Nations, one Scottish Six Days Trial win and eight ISDT Gold Medals. He was a member of the BSA factory racing team. In 1970, Smith was awarded the title of Member of the Order of the British Empire.

Riding career
Born in Colne, Lancashire, England, Smith began in competitions as a trials rider, becoming so successful that he was offered a place on the Norton factory team. After moving to BSA, he won the 1953 and 1954 British Trials Championship. BSA asked Smith to compete in motocross racing which he did with such success that he soon began to concentrate on a motocross career. 

In 1964 at the age of 30 he captured the 500cc Motocross World Championship, defeating the defending champion, Swede Rolf Tibblin, and was voted the Motorcycle News 'Man of the Year' award. He successfully defended his crown the following year. His 1965 championship win on the four-stroke engined BSA Victor would be the last victory for this type of motor, as two-stroke engine technology dominated off-road racing for the next several decades. He finally announced his retirement in January 1972.

After racing
After he retired from competition, Smith helped to develop off-road motorcycles as special projects manager based in Minnesota, US, for Can-Am, the motorcycle division of Canada's Bombardier organisation. The Can-Am racing team claimed the first three places in the 1974 AMA 250cc motocross national championship. He was inducted into the AMA Motorcycle Hall of Fame in 2000. 

Smith was an AMA director and Treasurer, and also involved in vintage motorcycle racing as an Executive Director and Assistant Treasurer of the American Historic Racing Motorcycle Association AHRMA, before resigning from AMA on 15 February 2008, followed by his resignation from AHRMA, as a result of irregular expense-account claims submitted by the then AMA Chairman.

References 

1934 births
Living people
People from Colne
Sportspeople from Wausau, Wisconsin
British motocross riders
Enduro riders
Motorcycle trials riders
Members of the Order of the British Empire
Date of birth missing (living people)